Mizuhara (written: 水原 lit. "water plain") is a Japanese surname. Notable people with the surname include:

, Japanese footballer
, Japanese model and actress
, Japanese actress

Fictional characters:
, character in the manga series Azumanga Daioh
, character in the Food Wars!: Shokugeki no Soma
Max Mizuhara, character in the anime series Beyblade

Japanese-language surnames